National Vanguard is an American white nationalist, neo-Nazi organization based in Charlottesville, Virginia, founded in 2005 by Kevin Alfred Strom and former members of the National Alliance.

History, structure, and changing leadership

The group was founded by former and expelled members of the National Alliance. The National Alliance's 5-man Executive Committee, a think-tank created by Erich Gliebe five months earlier to explore new ideas, issued a formal declaration called "A Time for Leadership." The declaration decried then-Chairman Erich Gliebe's dissolution of the National Alliance Board of Directors and his reducing of its composition to include merely himself and COO Shaun Walker. It called for a reconstitution of the Board of Directors, and the merger of the Board with the Executive Committee in both membership and function. Gliebe and Walker rejected the declaration.

In response, Gliebe and Walker claimed that Kevin Strom was not performing his job well as editor of the National Alliance's magazine, which was sometimes months late. There was a pay dispute where Kevin Strom claimed that Shaun Walker was not paying Strom his full salary, which became a public dispute within Internet chatrooms. This pay dispute and other internal conflicts created an atmosphere of factional personality conflicts which grew for 6 months until they erupted.

There were no legal options to take, so in April 2005 "National Vanguard" was formally organized by some former National Alliance Unit Coordinators and five members of the Executive Committee.

The main issues cited for the split with the National Alliance were over the creation of an expanded Board of Directors, prompt and professional publishing of a news-magazine and open accounting of all funds collected. The new organization picked Kevin Alfred Strom as its new leader, but a Board of Directors was not created. Within 8 months half of all National Vanguard members had either resigned or formed another new group. Most of the key leaders who planned the initial coup from the National Alliance group quit the National Vanguard within 15 months, but without all the open Internet airing of "internal laundry." In January 2007 Strom was arrested by the FBI and Federal Marshals for child pornography related charges. In 2008 he pleaded guilty to possession of child pornography (although he maintains that the possession was inadvertent) and was sentenced to 23 months in prison.

As of May 2015, National Vanguard maintains an active website featuring daily articles and updates.

Activities
Since the reorganization of National Vanguard, the group has been focused upon unit meetings and the distribution of fliers. A boycott against the hardware chain The Home Depot was started because of its stance on undocumented immigrants. Units in Florida, Nevada, and New Jersey appear to be the most active. Members are attempting to form a new political party in Nevada: the White People's Party. One plank in the party's platform calls for "the White Race" to be placed on the endangered species list since "all relevant laws are working against the continued existence of Whites."

In the wake of Hurricane Katrina, which struck the US Gulf Coast on August 29, 2005, a National Vanguard First Response Team was organized to help white families in Alabama and Mississippi on September 20, 2005.  Their decision to help only white victims has been described as reprehensible.

In 2005, National Vanguard showcased the pop-music duo Prussian Blue, twin sisters from Bakersfield, California, Lynx and Lamb Gaede, whom the organization hoped would "be breaking new ground... creating an entire genre of pro-White music" that will cross over to mainstream audiences. Their mother, April, is a writer and activist for National Vanguard.

References

External links 
National Vanguard
Nationalist Coalition (formerly National Vanguard, Tampa until February 2006)
European Americans United
Western Voices World News
 List of white nationalist organizations

Critical
Anti Defamation League article on the formation of National Vanguard
Article on National Vanguard's expulsion from Google News
Southern Poverty Law Center article on the creation of National Vanguard

American political websites
Organizations established in 2005
Neo-Nazi organizations in the United States